The Ray Brandes House is a Frank Lloyd Wright designed Usonian home located at 2202 212th Avenue SE, Sammamish, Washington It was constructed in 1952. The home is constructed in Frank Lloyd Wright's Usonian style which is designed to create flow between nature, the home and its interior. It is one of the better preserved examples of this style, and one of three homes designed by Frank Lloyd Wright in Washington State. Landscaping was selected from local flora and fauna, typical of Frank Lloyd Wright's preference.

References

 Storrer, William Allin. The Frank Lloyd Wright Companion. University Of Chicago Press, 2006,  (S.350)

External links
Wright Studies Ray and Mimi Brandes Residence, Sammamish (Issaquah), Washington (1952) (S.350)
Brandes house on waymarking.com
Tours & Lectures: Frank Lloyd Wright's Brandes Residence
Photos on Arcaid

Frank Lloyd Wright buildings
History of King County, Washington
National Register of Historic Places in King County, Washington
Houses on the National Register of Historic Places in Washington (state)
Architecture in Washington (state)
Modernist architecture in Washington (state)
Houses in King County, Washington
Sammamish, Washington